Lambda Chi Alpha, commonly known as Lambda Chi, is a college fraternity in North America. It was founded at Boston University in 1909. Lambda Chi Alpha is one of the largest social fraternities in North America with over 300,000 lifetime members and active chapters and colonies at 195 universities.

The youngest of the 15 largest social fraternities, Lambda Chi Alpha has initiated the third-highest number of men among all fraternities, based on NIC statistics. Lambda Chi's international headquarters is located in Carmel, Indiana, outside Indianapolis. Its members are referred to as Lambda Chis, LXAs, LCAs, Lambdas, Chops, and Choppers. It was a member of the North American Interfraternity Conference (NIC) until October 2015.

History

Founding 
Lambda Chi Alpha was founded by Warren A. Cole, a law student at Boston University School of Law in Boston. There are two different accounts of the fraternity's founding.

All were close friends and had been members of Alpha Mu Chi, a prep school fraternity. The Greek letter name is thought to have been used from the beginning, but is not recorded in the Alpha Zeta minutes until April 27, 1910.

A second account of the founding, based on interviews with contemporaries, is that Cole and others did belong to a loose group known as the Tombs or Cosmopolitan Club but this was not related to Lambda Chi Alpha's founding. Instead, according to the alternative account, Cole shared an apartment with James C. McDonald and Charles W. Proctor, who later joined Sigma Alpha Epsilon. The group issued a charter for itself that was backdated to November 15.

Cole approached many local groups at colleges and universities throughout the Northeast seeking others willing to join his new fraternity. He corresponded with or visited 117 institutions by 1912, when a group at Massachusetts Agricultural College accepted a charter to become Gamma Zeta. The first General Assembly, establishing  a structure for the national fraternity, was held in Boston on April 13, 1912.

Lambda Chi Alpha virtually replaced the fraternity Cole had established outside of its name. The 14th General Assembly, in 1931, recognized March 22 as Lambda Chi Alpha Day in recognition of these achievements. In 1942, the board of directors renamed it Founder's Day.  is also still recognized, so Lambda Chi Alpha celebrates two Founders Days annually.

In the years that followed, a divide opened between Cole and a group of young alumni led by Mason, Ernst J.C. Fischer of Lambda Chi's Cornell University chapter in Ithaca, New York, and Samuel Dyer of the University of Maine chapter in Orono, Maine. Dyer was supported by Albert Cross at the University of Pennsylvania chapter in Philadelphia and Louis Robbins of the Brown University chapter in Providence, Rhode Island. In 1920, Cole was ousted and Fischer was elected national president. In 1927, Fischer became international president when Epsilon-Epsilon Zeta at the University of Toronto in Toronto was chartered.

Theta Kappa Nu 

The Theta Kappa Nu fraternity was formed by 11 local fraternities on June 9, 1924 in Springfield, Missouri.

With the help of the North American Interfraternity Conference in identifying local groups, and Theta Kappa Nu's policy of granting charters quickly to organizations with good academic standards, the fraternity grew quickly, and had approximately 2,500 initiates in 40 chapters by the end of 1926.

Merger 
During the Great Depression, both Theta Kappa Nu and Lambda Chi Alpha saw membership decrease and chapters shut down. In 1939, the two fraternities agreed to merge. The merger ceremony was held at Howard College (now Samford University) chapter of Theta Kappa Nu in Birmingham, Alabama. The merger immediately increased the number of chapters from 77 to 105 (or 78 to 106) and the number of members from 20,000 to 27,000. At the time, this was the largest merger in fraternity history. All Theta Kappa Nu chapters became Lambda Chi Alpha chapters and were given chapter designations that began with either Theta, Kappa, or Nu.  At schools where chapters of both fraternities previously existed, the two merged and retained Lambda Chi's Zeta recognition.

Smoot 

In October 1958, a Lambda Chi pledge at MIT, Oliver R. Smoot, gained global recognition when his MIT fraternity brothers had him lay down repeatedly on Harvard Bridge between Boston and Cambridge while they measured the bridge using his height, which turned out to be 5 feet 7 inches. Smoot's height was defined as one "smoot", and Harvard Bridge was officially measured as  smoots long. The measurement is commemorated with a plaque on Harvard Bridge describing the incident.

In 2011, the word "smoot" and its definition were added to the fifth edition of the American Heritage Dictionary.

North American Interfraternity Conference 

The fraternity was a member of the North American Interfraternity Conference (NIC) from its earliest days. In October 2015, however, the fraternity left the NIC, citing in-fighting and dysfunctional governance. The fraternity's exit coincides with NIC lobbying for the Safe Campus Act, which is opposed by both the fraternity and sexual assault advocacy groups.

Pledging and hazing policy 
Beginning in August 1969, the concept of fraternity education replaced pledge education at Lambda Chi Alpha. The fraternity education program was designed to integrate all new members into the chapter equally.

In 1972, Lambda Chi Alpha officially abolished the pledge process and replaced it with associate membership. Associate members in Lambda Chi Alpha to this day have all of the same rights as initiated brothers, can hold officer positions, wear the letters, and can vote on all issues except for those involving Lambda Chi's initiation ritual. Status as an associate member permits new members to enter the fraternity with respect, and helps to combat the issues that arise from the possible abuse of pledges. Lambda Chi Alpha was the first fraternal organization to abolish pledging. "Pledge implies a second-class membership, indentured servitude, hazing, class officers, and extensive memorization. Pledge implies a fixed length of menial membership that is used as a gateway to full membership, with often significantly lower expectations," according to Paedagogus, published by the fraternity.

Lambda Chi Alpha formally prohibits hazing of any form, on or off campus, by its members. The fraternity's constitution defines hazing as "any action taken or situation created intentionally to produce physical discomfort or mental discomfort by embarrassment, harassment, or ridicule." The fraternity first condemned hazing at a 1928 North American Interfraternity Conference meeting.

Fraternity-related incidents

20th century 
In 1958, the fraternity expelled its Hamilton College chapter in Clinton, New York, for insisting on a non-discrimination policy for admitting members. The national fraternity insisted that its members be Christians who were either white or American Indians. The expelled chapter reorganized as an independent society called Gryphon, which continued to operate for more than two decades.

In 1988, James Callahan, an associate at Rutgers University in New Brunswick, New Jersey, died of an alcohol overdose from a Lambda Chi Alpha drinking hazing ritual. Fifteen members of the chapter were indicted for his death.

2000s 
In 2007, Remy Okonkwo, a member at Georgetown College in Georgetown, Kentucky, was found hanging in the fraternity house on campus. The coroner ruled his death a suicide but his family still believes foul play was involved.

In 2008, the chapter at San Diego State University in San Diego was suspended by the university for four years for hazing and alcohol violations.

In 2009, the chapter at University of Southern California in Los Angeles was suspended after three women accused members of sexual assault. In 2011, the chapter was disciplined again for hazing new members.

2010s 
In 2011, the chapter at Florida State University in Tallahassee, Florida was suspended after a fraternity member died from being accidentally shot at the fraternity house by a fellow fraternity member.

In 2012, the University of Nevada, Reno chapter in Reno, Nevada was suspended by the university and the fraternity's board of directors. The chapter had been on probation for alcohol-related violations.

In 2013, the chapter at Vanderbilt University in Nashville, Tennessee was suspended as a result of hazing and alcohol-related violations.

In May 2014, following a yearlong investigation, seven members at the University of Illinois Urbana-Champaign were arrested and charged with using and distributing illegal drugs. Police found MDMA pills, 40 grams of MDMA powder, cocaine residue, Adderall pills, suspected LSD, cannabis, a large tank of nitrous oxide, and drug paraphernalia in the fraternity house. As a place to purchase drugs, the fraternity had reportedly gained the nickname "the candy shop", according to The News-Gazette.

In October 2014, the Lambda Chi Alpha General Fraternity (LCAGF) board of directors voted to suspend its Lambda Zeta chapter at the MIT in Cambridge, Massachusetts for at least five years due to "conduct that does not support the fraternity’s priority of providing a healthy chapter environment for its members."

In January 2015, the chapter at Sam Houston State University in Huntsville, Texas, was suspended until 2019 for multiple alcohol violations.

In March 2015, the chapter at East Tennessee State University in Johnson City, Tennessee was suspended for five years for hazing associate members, accepting ineligible members, and hosting unauthorized parties with alcohol present.

In February 2016, the chapter at the University of Tennessee at Knoxville in Knoxville, Tennessee was shut down after repeated hazing violations and disorderly conduct reports.

In March 2016, the chapter at Southern Methodist University in University Park, Texas was given a five-year suspension for hazing and code of conduct violations. The fraternity was previously suspended in 2009 for similar infractions that led to the expulsion of 35 out of its 92 members.

In May 2016, the fraternity's national office suspended the chapter at the University of Oregon in Eugene, Oregon after a Lambda Chi Alpha cooler was discovered among a half-mile-wide swath of trash left behind at Lake Shasta. An estimated 1,000 students had docked houseboats over the weekend, but a photo of the cooler decorated with the phrase "Do you wanna do some blow man?" had gone viral on the Internet.

In August 2016, Colson Machlitt, a football player at Georgetown College in Georgetown, Kentucky, died after allegedly jumping down a flight of stairs at the fraternity. Alcohol was suspected to be involved in his death.

The chapter at Butler University in Indianapolis was suspended by the school without citing a specific reason, although the Indianapolis Star reported that alcohol violations played a part. The university said it would not consider reinstating the chapter until 2021. Following the suspension, a woman filed a civil rights complaint against the university, saying that it grossly mishandled her allegation that she was raped by a member of the fraternity during a fraternity party. The fraternity member had previously been accused of sexual misconduct by another student.

In April 2018, the chapter at Cal Poly, SLO in San Luis Obispo, California, was placed on interim suspension after social media images surfaced depicting members dressed up as gang members and one wearing blackface during the school's multicultural celebration weekend.

The Indiana University-Bloomington chapter in Bloomington, Indiana, was placed under a two-year suspension after an associate member reported hazing activities occurring in the chapter house to the university. Reports of brutal physical exercise, liquor hazing, and the act of capping were mentioned in the report. In response, the fraternity's national office removed over 100 members, who will be able to fully recolonize in fall 2021.

In 2019, the chapter at the University of South Carolina in Columbia, South Carolina, was kicked off campus until 2023 for hazing and alcohol violations. The chapter also was suspended for breaking other rules established by the fraternity's national office.

2020s 
In 2020, the University of Georgia chapter in Athens, Georgia, was suspended after racist and other insensitive text messages between members were exposed by a fellow student on Twitter.

The Texas Christian University chapter in Fort Worth, Texas was suspended following an investigation into hazing violations.

Philanthropy 

From 1993 to 2012, Lambda Chi Alpha's philanthropy was the North American Food Drive (NAFD). As of 2010, NAFD had collected around 33 million pounds of food for food banks. In 2012, NAFD was discontinued under that name and rolled into an ongoing partnership with Feeding America.

In 2017, Lambda Chi Alpha announced a trial partnership with the St. Baldrick's Foundation, a Monrovia, California-based organization that funds childhood cancer research. Chapters were encouraged to host or participate in head-shaving events to raise money for the foundation.

In 2019, Lambda Chi Alpha announced a partnership with The Jed Foundation, a Boston-based non-profit organization that seeks to protect emotional health and prevent suicide for teens and young adults. Together, they are launching Lambda Chi Alpha Lifeline, an online mental health resource center tailored from the foundation’s ULifeline website, which provides college students with information about emotional health issues and specific resources available to them on their respective campus. It also offers a confidential mental health self-screening tool.

In 2020, Lambda Chi Alpha announced its partnership with Movember, an Australia-based non-profit foundation that raises awareness of men's health issues such as prostate cancer, testicular cancer, and men's suicide. Movember has recently become a primary philanthropic focus for Lambda Chi Alpha and the fraternity's national administrative office.

Notable members

Chapters

Chapter locations 

Chapters of Lambda Chi Alpha exist in most U.S. states and three Canadian provinces.

Chapter naming 
Lambda Chi Alpha is atypical in its naming scheme. Unlike most fraternities, the order in which chapters are named is not strictly based on the Greek alphabet. Instead, Lambda Chi Alpha chapters are known as Zetas. As such, for instance, the Alpha-Beta chapter is designated Alpha-Beta Zeta. In addition, since the fraternity's founding, Cole assigned Greek letters to petitioning groups that had not yet been chartered. Not all of these groups were chartered, however. As a result, the first 22 chapters were designated Α, Γ, Ε, Ζ, Ι, Λ, Β, Σ, Φ, Δ, Π, Ο, Μ, Τ, Η, Θ, Υ, Ξ, Χ, Ω, Κ, Ν, Ρ, Ψ. After the 24th chapter, the sequence was continued with a prefix following the same sequence (Α-Α, Α-Γ, Α-Ε, ... Γ-Α, Γ-Γ, Γ-Ε, ... Ε-A, etc.)

When Theta Kappa Nu merged with Lambda Chi Alpha in 1939, the former Theta Kappa Nu chapters were each given chapter designations prefixed with Θ, Κ, or Ν. The second letter of their chapter name was assigned in the order mentioned above and applied to the chapters in order of their precedence in Theta Kappa Nu. On campuses with chapters of both Lambda Chi Alpha and Theta Kappa Nu, the chapter of Lambda Chi Alpha kept its original designation.

A singular exception was the chapter at Georgia Tech in Atlanta, Β-Κ Zeta, which was named in recognition of its existence as a chapter of the Beta Kappa, a national fraternity whose other existing chapters merged with Theta Chi in 1942.

Headquarters locations 
Lambda Chi Alpha was founded in Boston in 1909, and the fraternity's national office was based outside Boston until after World War I. It was then moved to Northeastern Pennsylvania and eventually to Indianapolis, Indiana, where many other fraternity and sorority national headquarters are located.
 1909: Swansea, Massachusetts
 1920: 261 Pierce St, Kingston, Pennsylvania, 18704
 1920: 160 S Main St, Wilkes-Barre, Pennsylvania 18701
 1920: 30-40 N Pennsylvania St, Indianapolis, Indiana 46205
 1923: 136 E Market St, Indianapolis, Indiana 46204
 1930: 55 Monument Cir, Indianapolis, Indiana 46204
 1940: 2029 N Meridian St, Indianapolis, Indiana 46202
 1954: 3434 N Washington Blvd, Indianapolis, Indiana 46205
 1974: 8741 Founders Rd, Indianapolis, Indiana 46268
 2014: 11711 N. Pennsylvania Street Suite 250, Carmel, Indiana 46032

In popular culture
Lambda Chi Alpha is referenced in the Kenny Chesney song "Keg in the Closet", which includes the lyrics: "This ol' guitar taught me how to score, right there on that Lambda Chi porch, Mary Ann taught me a little more, about wanting what you can't have."

See also 
 List of Lambda Chi Alpha brothers
 List of Lambda Chi Alpha chapters

Notes and references

External links 

 Official website
Lambda Chi Foundation official website
 Notable Lambda Chi Alpha alumni, Lambda Chi Alpha web site

 
1909 establishments in Massachusetts
Active former members of the North American Interfraternity Conference
Carmel, Indiana
Fraternities and sororities in Canada
Fraternities and sororities in the United States
International student societies
Non-profit organizations based in Indiana
Student organizations established in 1909